Stephanus Petrus Wessels (born 9 November 1992) is a South African rugby union player, who last played with the . He plays as a loosehead prop.

Rugby career

2009 : Schoolboy rugby

Wessels was born in Paarl. He attended Jan Kriel School in Kuils River, a school for Learners with Special Educational Needs (LSEN), from where he was selected in a South African LSEN team that competed at the 2009 Under-18 Craven Week tournament held in East London. He started all three of their matches and scored a try in their match against Boland.

2011 : Western Province

In 2011, Wessels made four appearances for the  team in the Under-19 Provincial Championship. He started one of those – as a tighthead prop in a 9–all draw against the s – and three appearances as a replacement.

2012 : Griquas

Wessels moved to Kimberley for the 2012 season.

2013–present : Boland Cavaliers

Wessels moved back to the Western Cape for the 2013, joining the Wellington-based . He made seven starts for the  team in the 2013 Under-21 Provincial Championship regular season, scoring two tries in their final match against  to finish second on the log and secure a play-off spot.

At the start of 2014, Wessels took part in the national amateur club rugby competition, the Community Cup, for Roses United. He helped them finish top of Pool C, and eventual sixth place in the competition after losing to Despatch in the Bowl Final.

Wessels returned to Vodacom Cup action in 2015, making six appearances in the competition. After four appearances off the bench, he made his first senior start against the Eastern Province Kings in Citrusdal, followed by a second start a week later against the Border Bulldogs. He was then named in their Currie Cup qualification squad, starting all six of their matches as his team finished in fourth position, unable to clinch a place in the Currie Cup Premier Division. He made three starts for them in the First Division, but five consecutive defeats condemned the team to fifth place, missing out on the play-offs.

Wessels made six starts for the Boland Cavaliers during the 2016 Currie Cup qualification competition. It proved to be a successful campaign under new head coach Brent Janse van Rensburg, with Boland finishing in third position in the competition to qualify for the Premier Division for the first time since 2009.

References

South African rugby union players
Living people
1992 births
Sportspeople from Paarl
Rugby union props
Boland Cavaliers players
Rugby union players from the Western Cape